Thanhoffer Enrico (Munico), was born in Como (Italy) in the year 1965. He is an architect and artist.

Early life
A resume full training after graduating in architecture at the Polytechnic University of Milan earned an MASTER at the POST Oikos University, (funded and recognized by the European Community FSE) and the title of "Expert in Executive Planning".

Career
After an experience at the Public Administrations of over 10 years, he finally opened his studio. 
It deals with architectural design. It presents a variety of publications. 
The art doesn’t consist of representing new things, but in representing with news.
A philosophy that has brought Enrico Thanhoffer to match his great passion for painting with his profession of architect.
Two world that are apparently distant, but that show a common denominator: creativity.
For several years now, Enrico Thanhoffer is also an appreciated painter, awarded with several prizes and winner of some competitions, as well as inventor of an innovative pictorial technique. His paintings, a mix between figurative geometric and an abstract that calls to mind the famous rooms of Hilbert are realized using the computer.
After having  "baptized" this new artistic wave as Globismo, that means the skill to let the abstract dialogue with the figurative, Enrico Thanhoffer, known as Munico in the art world (acronym of " unified method to build", as additional witness of his "real" profession), introduced the philosophy that stands at the basis of this new artistic manifesto also inside his architecture.

References

External links 
 

Place of birth missing (living people)
1965 births
Living people
Architects from Milan
Polytechnic University of Milan alumni